Coleman House is a historic home located at Lewes, Sussex County, Delaware. It dates to about 1815, and consists of a 2-story, three bay, frame main section with -story, frame wing.  Both sections are sheathed in cypress and have gable roofs.  It is an outstanding example of the early-19th-century rural architecture once common in the Lewes area.

It was added to the National Register of Historic Places in 1977.

References

External links

Houses on the National Register of Historic Places in Delaware
Houses completed in 1815
Houses in Lewes, Delaware
Historic American Buildings Survey in Delaware
National Register of Historic Places in Sussex County, Delaware